Information exchange or information sharing means that people or other entities pass information from one to another. This could be done electronically or through certain systems. These are terms that can either refer to bidirectional information transfer in telecommunications and computer science or communication seen from a system-theoretic or information-theoretic point of view. As, "information," in this context invariably refers to (electronic) data that encodes and represents the information at hand, a broader treatment can be found under data exchange.

Information exchange has a long history in information technology. Traditional information sharing referred to one-to-one exchanges of data between a sender and receiver. Online information sharing gives useful data to businesses for future strategies based on online sharing. These information exchanges are implemented via dozens of open and proprietary protocols, message, and file formats. Electronic data interchange (EDI) is a successful implementation of commercial data exchanges that began in the late 1970s and remains in use today.

Some controversy comes when discussing regulations regarding information exchange. Initiatives to standardize information sharing protocols include extensible markup language (XML), simple object access protocol (SOAP), and web services description language (WSDL).

From the point of view of a computer scientist, the four primary information sharing design patterns are sharing information one-to-one, one-to-many, many-to-many, and many-to-one. Technologies to meet all four of these design patterns are evolving and include blogs, wikis, really simple syndication, tagging, and chat.

One example of United States government's attempt to implement one of these design patterns (one to one) is the National Information Exchange Model (NIEM). One-to-one exchange models fall short of supporting all of the required design patterns needed to fully implement data exploitation technology.

Advanced information sharing platforms provide controlled vocabularies, data harmonization, data stewardship policies and guidelines, standards for uniform data as they relate to privacy, security, and data quality.

Information Sharing, Intelligence Reform, and Terrorism Prevention Act
The term information sharing gained popularity as a result of the 9/11 Commission Hearings and its report of the United States government's lack of response to information known about the planned terrorist attack on the New York City World Trade Center prior to the event. The resulting commission report led to the enactment of several executive orders by President Bush that mandated agencies to implement policies to "share information" across organizational boundaries. In addition, an Information Sharing Environment Program Manager (PM-ISE) was appointed, tasked to implement the provisions of the Intelligence Reform and Terrorism Prevention Act of 2004. In making recommendation toward the creation of an "Information Sharing Environment" the 9/11 Commission based itself on the findings and recommendations made by the Markle Task Force on National Security in the Information Age.

See also
Channel (communications)
Communications protocol
Sexual recombination enables cross-pollination in bio
Data mapping
Electronic data interchange
Fusion center
Information Exchange Gateway
Knowledge sharing
Semi-structured data
Data interchange standards
Health information exchange
Cyberinfrastructure

References

Information theory
Sharing